Samuel Pang (born 3 November 1973) is an Australian comedian, radio and television presenter, writer and producer. Pang co-hosts Chrissie, Sam & Browny on Nova 100 with Chrissie Swan and Jonathan Brown and co-hosts The Front Bar with Mick Molloy and Andy Maher and is also a recurring panelist on Network 10's Have You Been Paying Attention? with Ed Kavalee.

Career

Early career
Pang played Australian rules football for the Collingwood under-19s team in 1991 as well as Prahran in the VFA. He then went on to play country football in regional Victoria and Tasmania for a number of years. He remained in the city holding down a range of odd jobs and received a small fee for his football services.

He studied marketing at university.

Radio
Pang turned to radio hosting at the age of 28 at the urging of his friends to do so. He co-hosted Triple R's Breakfasters program for 5 years.

In January 2011, Pang presented Summer Nights on ABC Local Radio. During the course of the 2012 London Olympics alongside Santo Cilauro, Pang presented The Rush Hour on Melbourne's Triple M while regular hosts James Brayshaw and Billy Brownless were at the Olympics.

In January 2016, Pang was appointed co-host of the Nova 100 breakfast program, Chrissie, Sam & Browny alongside Chrissie Swan and Jonathan Brown.

In September 2016, Pang joined Santo Cilauro and Ed Kavalee to co-host a podcast version of Santo, Sam and Ed's Total Football on ABC Radio.

Television
Pang's television career is known for his hosting roles in a variety of television shows. His first hosting role was in 2009, when he hosted ADbc, a quiz show based on history-related topics. It aired on SBS One and lasted for one season.

In 2010, he co-hosted Santo, Sam and Ed's Cup Fever!, a variety/panel/sports program coinciding with the FIFA World Cup on SBS TV. He co-hosted it with Santo Cilauro and Ed Kavalee. He has written for TV Burp, which was also hosted by Ed Kavalee on Channel Seven.

In 2009, he began doing some commentary work with Julia Zemiro on the Eurovision Song Contest as part of the Australian delegation. He remained in this role until 2017.

As of February 2012, he has reunited with Santo Cilauro and Ed Kavalee to co-host a spin-off of Cup Fever on Channel Seven called Santo, Sam and Ed's Sports Fever!. In August 2012, Pang was one of the reporters for ABC2 for the 2012 Paralympic Games in London.

In late 2013, Pang reunited with Santo Cilauro and Ed Kavalee to co-host Santo, Sam and Ed's Total Football on Fox Sports. The show lasted two seasons, finishing in 2015.

Since 2013, Pang has been a regular panellist on Network Ten's weekly game show, Have You Been Paying Attention?. The show has won numerous Logie Awards.

Since 2015, he has co-hosted The Front Bar alongside Mick Molloy and Andy Maher, which airs on Channel Seven.

Pang presented a 2017 Logie Award with Lorrae Desmond, his mother's cousin.

References

External links

Living people
Place of birth missing (living people)
Australian male film actors
Australian radio personalities
Australian game show hosts
Australian male comedians
Australian podcasters
Australian people of Chinese descent
1973 births
Radio personalities from Melbourne